Scary Mommy is a website that produces content targeting mothers, which generally focuses on parenting, motherhood, current events and pop culture. The site is owned by Bustle Digital Group and is based in New York City.

History
 
Scary Mommy was launched in March 2008 by Jill Smokler in Baltimore, Maryland. In April 2012, Smokler published a companion book entitled Confessions of a Scary Mommy, which became a New York Times best seller. In 2013, Smokler established Scary Mommy Nation, a 501(c)3 non-profit that raised money for families that could not afford a Thanksgiving dinner. By 2014, the site  earned its first Webby Award in the "Family/Parenting" category. It would go on to win additional Webby Awards in 2015 and 2018.

In February 2015, the website was acquired by Some Spider Studios. Smokler remained with the company as chief content officer. After the Some Spider acquisition, Scary Mommy added an in-house studio along with video producers, editors, staff writers, and other contributors.

In February 2018, it became the first parenting channel on Snapchat's Discover feature. In May 2018, Smokler left Scary Mommy. At the time, the site was reaching 80 million monthly unique visitors.

In 2020, Fatherly was acquired by Some Spider Studios, the parent of Scary Mommy. In 2021, Bustle Digital Group acquired Some Spider.

Content
 
Scary Mommy originally served as a blog for its creator, Jill Smokler, to discuss parenting and motherhood. Smokler also introduced the Scary Mommy Confessions feature, which allows users to anonymously post messages about motherhood.

In 2015, the site began featuring videos and articles created by a staff of writers. It also operates a channel on Snapchat's Discover feature. In 2017, the site began developing, Lullaby League, a lullaby singing competition show hosted by Jim O'Heir. That year, the site averaged 13.2 million monthly visitors in the United States. Simultaneously, the show aired on the television network Pop.

References

External links
 Official website
 Some Spider Studios
 Jill Smokler Official

Parenting websites
American women's websites
Internet properties established in 2008